Ivor Bertie Guest, 1st Baron Wimborne, 2nd Baronet, DL (29 August 1835 – 22 February 1914) was a British industrialist and a member of the prominent Guest family.

Early life
Ivor Bertie Guest was born at Dowlais, near Merthyr Tydfil, the son of Lady Charlotte Guest, translator of the Mabinogion, and Sir John Josiah Guest, 1st Baronet, owner of the world's largest iron foundry, Dowlais Ironworks. His middle name (Bertie) was from his mother's family, the Earls of Abingdon, descended from a Tudor courtier who married the Dowager Duchess of Suffolk (herself suo jure Baroness Willoughby de Eresby).

His siblings included Montague Guest (1839–1909), a Liberal politician, Arthur Edward Guest (1841–1898), a Conservative politician, Charlotte Maria Guest (d. 1902), Mary Enid Evelyn Guest, who married Austen Henry Layard, and Blanche Guest, who married Edward Ponsonby, 8th Earl of Bessborough.

Guest was educated at Harrow School in Middlesex, and he went on to gain a Master of Arts degree in 1856 from Trinity College, Cambridge.

Titles
Following his father's death in 1852, Guest succeeded to his father's baronetcy. In 1880, he was elevated to the peerage as Baron Wimborne, of Canford Magna in the County of Dorset, on Disraeli's initiative.

Career
Guest was commissioned a cornet in the Dorsetshire Yeomanry on 20 April 1858 and was promoted to lieutenant on 11 March 1867.

He held the office of High Sheriff of Glamorgan in 1862 and was the mayor of Poole from 1896 to 1897. In 1879, he rebuilt the real tennis court at Canford. He was lampooned in Vanity Fair as "the paying Guest".

From 1874 on, he stood unsuccessfully for election to the House of Commons as a Conservative, contesting Glamorganshire at the 1874 general election, Poole at a by-election in May 1874, and Bristol at a by-election in 1878 and at the 1880 general election. However, following the tariff reform by Chamberlain, he seceded from the Conservative party and sat in the House of Lords as a Liberal.

He was President of the Dean Close Memorial School from 1902, and a Deputy Lieutenant of Dorset.

Marriage and issue

On 25 May 1868, Guest married Lady Cornelia Henrietta Maria Spencer-Churchill (1847–1927). She was the daughter of John Spencer-Churchill, 7th Duke of Marlborough, thus making Guest an uncle-by-marriage of Winston Churchill, later the Prime Minister of the United Kingdom.

Their children included the following:
Frances Guest (1869–1957), later known as Lady Chelmsford, who married Frederic Thesiger, 1st Viscount Chelmsford, who served as Viceroy of India.
Ivor Churchill Guest (1873–1939), who married the Hon. Alice Grosvenor (1880–1948).
Christian Henry Charles Guest (1874–1957), who married the Hon. Frances Lyttelton (1885–1918).
Frederick "Freddie" Edward Guest (1875–1937), who married Amy Phipps (1873–1959), daughter of American industrialist Henry Phipps.
Lionel George William Guest (1880–1935), who married Flora Bigelow (former wife of Charles S. Dodge), daughter of U.S. Ambassador John Bigelow.  
Oscar Montague Guest (1888–1958), who married Kathleen Paterson (b. 1903).

He died on 22 February 1914 at Canford Manor in Dorset and was succeeded by his eldest son, Ivor Churchill Guest, 2nd Baron Wimborne, 1st Baron Ashby St Ledgers, who was later created Viscount Wimborne. His will was proved in April 1914, provisionally at £250,000.

Residences
In 1867, Guest bought at auction "Hamilton House", located at 22 Arlington Street in the St. James's district of the City of Westminster in central London, from the widow of William Hamilton, 11th Duke of Hamilton. As the house had traditionally been renamed with the title of each peer who owned it, upon receiving his title in 1880, Guest renamed the house as "Wimborne House".

Wimborne acquired the Highland sporting estate of Glencarron (Ross-shire) in the 1860s, building a Lodge (Alexander Ross / William Joass, c. 1868). He extended it with Glenuaig Estate, possibly 1871, together comprising 15,000 acres. On the opening of the "Dingwall and Kyle Railway" in 1870, Glencarron Lodge was provided with a private platform.

References

External links
 

1835 births
1914 deaths
People from Merthyr Tydfil
People educated at Harrow School
Alumni of Trinity College, Cambridge
Welsh industrialists
20th-century Welsh businesspeople
19th-century Welsh businesspeople
Barons in the Peerage of the United Kingdom
Deputy Lieutenants of Dorset
High Sheriffs of Glamorgan
Ivor Bertie
Conservative Party (UK) hereditary peers
Queen's Own Dorset Yeomanry officers
Liberal Party (UK) hereditary peers
Peers of the United Kingdom created by Queen Victoria